1985 Bakhtar Afghan Airlines Antonov An-26 shootdown was on 4 September 1985 when a Bakhtar Afghan Airlines Antonov An-26 (registered in Afghanistan as YA-BAM) on a scheduled internal flight from Kandahar to Farah was shot down by a ground-to-air missile. The aircraft had departed from Kandahar Airport and had circled twice close to the airport to gain height and then set course for Farah Airport, it was at a height of 3800 metres and 18.5 km west of Khandahar when it was shot down and destroyed by a ground-to-air missile. All five crew and 47 passengers were killed.

Aircraft
The aircraft was an Antonov An-26 twin-engined turboprop airliner that had been built in the Soviet Union.

References
Citations

Mass murder in 1985
Accidents and incidents involving the Antonov An-26
Aviation accidents and incidents in Afghanistan
Aviation accidents and incidents in 1985
Airliner shootdown incidents
1985 in Afghanistan
20th-century aircraft shootdown incidents
September 1985 events in Asia
1985 crimes in Afghanistan
1980s murders in Afghanistan
1985 murders in Asia
1985 disasters in  Afghanistan